

Llanllowell is a village in Monmouthshire, southeast Wales, in the United Kingdom. It is two miles southeast of Usk, in the community of Llantrisant Fawr.

Location
Llanllowell stands on the eastern bank of the River Usk.

History
The parish church is now considered dedicated to Saint Llywel. However, it was almost certainly originally dedicated to Saint Hywel.

References

External links
 Genuki on Llanllowell

Villages in Monmouthshire